Gheorghe Munteanu Murgoci (July 20, 1872 – March 5, 1925) was a renowned Romanian geologist, founder of the South-Eastern European Studies Institute in Bucharest. In 1923, he was elected a corresponding member of the Romanian Academy.

Munteanu Murgoci was a native of Măcin, Tulcea County. He studied at the Saint Sava High School and then at the University of Bucharest. As part of a group of professors, physicians, soldiers, and others, he helped bring Scouting to Romania.

He married the British zoologist and folklorist Agnes Murgoci in 1904, together they had two children.

A high school in Brăila is named "Colegiul Național Gheorghe Munteanu Murgoci" in his honor.

Bibliography 
 Ioana Frunte-Lată, Oameni de știință tulceni – Mic dicționar biobibliografic, Tulcea, 2015, p 94–101

Notes

1872 births
1925 deaths
People from Măcin
Corresponding members of the Romanian Academy
Romanian scientists
Scouting pioneers
Scouting and Guiding in Romania
University of Bucharest alumni
Saint Sava National College alumni